France participated in the inaugural Paralympic Games in 1960 in Rome, and has taken part in every edition of the Summer and Winter Paralympics since then. France was the host country of the 1992 Winter Paralympics.

French athletes have won a total of 1,263 medals at the Paralympic Games, of which 416 is gold, placing France fourth on the all-time Paralympic Games medal table.

Among its most successful competitors is swimmer Béatrice Hess, winner of 20 gold medals.

Medal tables

Red border color indicates host nation status.

Medals by Summer Games

Medals by Winter Games

Medals by summer sport

Medals by winter sport 

Best results in non-medaling sports:

Multi-medalists

Summer Paralympics

Multiple medalists
This is a list of French athletes who have won at least three gold medals or five medals.

Multi medals in a single Games
This is a list of French athletes who have won at least two gold medals in a single Games. Ordered categorically by gold medals earned, sports then year.

Multi medals in a single event
This is a list of French athletes who have won at least two gold medals in a single event at the Summer Paralympics. Ordered categorically by medals earned, sports then gold medals earned.

Most appearances
This is a list of French athletes who have competed in four or more Summer Paralympic Games. Active athletes are in bold. Athletes who were under 15 years of age or over 40 years of age are in bold.

Winter Paralympics

See also
 France at the Olympics

References